Gospel of Judas may refer to:

Gospel of Judas, a Gnostic gospel, the text of which was partially reconstructed in 2006
The Gospel According to Judas, a 2007 novel by Jeffrey Archer and Frank Moloney
The Judas Gospel, a novel by Peter Van Greenaway originally published in 1972
The Gospel of Judas, a novel by Roberto Pazzi originally published in 1989
The Gospel of Judas, a novel by Simon Mawer originally published in 2000
The Gospel of Judas, a novel by Robert Morel